KFUO may refer to:

 KFUO (AM), a radio station (850 AM) licensed to Clayton, Missouri, United States
 KFUO-FM, a former radio station (99.1 FM) licensed to Clayton, Missouri, United States